Kadidal is a village located in Thirthalli Taluq of the Shivamogga District in India.

The village is dominated by the gowda community. The place was named in memory of a great warrior who won many battles for a king in the past. The place has five main families.

References

Villages in Shimoga district